Rex M. Cunningham (November 19, 1907 – January 12, 1969) served in the California State Assembly for the 37th district. During World War II he also served in the United States Army.

References

United States Army personnel of World War II
Democratic Party members of the California State Assembly
1907 births
1969 deaths